(born January 16, 1978), who goes by the stage name , is a Japanese actor, stunt performer and suit actor from Yachiyo, Chiba Prefecture affiliated with Japan Action Enterprises. He has been cast in many leading roles in the Kamen Rider series. He has also been featured in other several commercials, such as one titled .

Suit Actor Roles

Kamen Rider Series

Super Sentai Series
 Tokusou Sentai Dekaranger (2004–2005) - Deka Break
 Tokusou Sentai Dekaranger the Movie: Full Blast Action (2004) - Deka Break
 Engine Sentai Go-Onger (2008–2009) - Barbaric Machine Beasts
 Kaizoku Sentai Gokaiger (2011–2012) - Deka Break

V-Cinema
 Tokusou Sentai Dekaranger vs. Abaranger (2005) - Deka Break
 Mahou Sentai Magiranger vs. Dekaranger (2006) - Deka Break
 Chō Ninja Tai Inazuma! (2006) - Raiden
 GoGo Sentai Boukenger vs. Super Sentai (2007) - DekaBreak
 Kamen Rider Den-O: Singing, Dancing, Great Training!! (2007) - Urataros
 Kamen Rider Decade: Protect! The World of Televikun (2009) - Kamen Rider Diend
 Kamen Rider W: Donburi's α/Farewell Recipe of Love (2010) - Kamen Rider Accel
 Kamen Rider W Returns: Kamen Rider Accel (2011) - Kamen Rider Accel

Non-suit Actor Roles
Engine Sentai Go-Onger (2008–2009) - Officer B
Kamen Rider G (2009) - The Man who fell from the terrace (Uncredited)
Net Edition Kamen Rider Decade: All Riders Super Spin-off (2009) - Himself (Eitoku/8-kun)<ref name="Net">Net Edition Kamen Rider Decade: All Riders Super Spin-off Episode 14: Which One! Eitoku: Beware of Eito-kun?</ref>Kamen Rider W (2009–2010) - Gaia Memory DistributorKamen Rider OOO (2010–2011) - Man in the backgroundNet Movie: Kamen Rider × Super Sentai: Super Hero Taihen: Who Is the Culprit?! (2012) - HimselfKamen Rider Fourze the Net Edition: Everyone, Let's Go to Class! (2012) - HimselfTiger & Bunny the Live'' (2012) - Keith Goodman

References

Japanese male actors
1978 births
Living people
People from Chiba Prefecture
Actors from Chiba Prefecture
People from Yachiyo, Chiba